Ciboulette  is a French opérette in three acts, music by Reynaldo Hahn, libretto by Robert de Flers and Francis de Croisset, first performed at the Théâtre des Variétés, in Paris, on 7 April 1923. One of the most elegant and refined compositions of Hahn, it is considered one of the last masterpieces of French operetta.

Principal roles

Synopsis

The action takes place in Paris, in 1867.

Duparquet is the controller of Les Halles, and plays matchmaker between the young farm-girl Ciboulette and Antonin, a young spoiled aristocrat. After many adventures, the lovers are united.

Discography
 Ciboulette (abridged) - Géori Boué, Roger Bourdin, Raymond Amadé - Orchestre de la Société des Concerts du Conservatoire, Marcel Cariven - Pathé (1952).
 Ciboulette (abridged) - Andrée Grandjean, Willy Clément, Michel Hamel, Françoise Ogéas - Chorus and Orchestra of the Théâtre des Champs-Élysées, Paul Bonneau - Ducretet-Thomson (1955).
 Ciboulette - Mady Mesplé, José van Dam, Nicolai Gedda, Colette Alliot-Lugaz - Ensemble Choral Jean Laforge, Orchestre Philarmonique de Monte-Carlo, Cyril Diederich - EMI (1983).

Adaptations
French director Claude Autant-Lara made the operetta into the film Ciboulette in 1933.

Sources

 Le guide de l'opéra, R. Mancini & J.J. Rouvereux, (Fayard, 1986)

External links
 Ciboulette

Operas by Reynaldo Hahn
French-language operas
Opérettes
1923 operas
Operas
Operas set in Paris